Daughtry may refer to:

Daughtry (band), a rock band fronted by Chris Daughtry
Daughtry (album), debut music album from Daughtry
Chris Daughtry (born 1979), American Idol finalist in 2006 and lead vocalist for Daughtry
Mattie Daughtry, American politician
N. Leo Daughtry (born 1940), American state senator from North Carolina (Republican)
Dean Daughtry (1946–2023), American keyboardist with the Atlanta Rhythm Section